Yu Xiaoyu (born 1 August 1992) is a Chinese badminton player. He started playing badminton at aged 9, and in 2009, he was selected to join the national team after trained in Beijing badminton team. His sister Yu Xiaohan is also a badminton player. He was the mixed doubles runner-up at the 2015 New Zealand Open partnered with Xia Huan.

Achievements

BWF Grand Prix 
The BWF Grand Prix has two levels: Grand Prix and Grand Prix Gold. It is a series of badminton tournaments, sanctioned by Badminton World Federation (BWF) since 2007.

Mixed Doubles

 BWF Grand Prix Gold tournament
 BWF Grand Prix tournament

References

External links 
 

1992 births
Living people
Chinese male badminton players
Badminton players from Beijing